This is a list of monuments and memorials to presidents of the United States in other countries.

Canada 

 Franklin Delano Roosevelt Bridge
 John F. Kennedy High School (Montreal)
 Ontario Street (Montreal), President Kennedy Avenue
 Quebec Route 173, Route-du-Président-Kennedy
 Roosevelt Campobello International Park
 Warren G. Harding Memorial

Poland 

 Plac Wilsona metro station
 Ronald Reagan Monument (Warsaw)
 Ronald Reagan Park, Gdańsk
 Wilson Square

United Kingdom 

 Abraham Lincoln: The Man
 J. F. Kennedy Memorial, Birmingham
 Andrew Jackson Centre
 John F Kennedy Catholic School
 John F. Kennedy Memorial, London
 John F. Kennedy Memorial, Runnymede
 Kennedy Scholarship
 Lincoln Memorial Tower
 Scottish American Soldiers Monument, depicting a standing figure of Abraham Lincoln, with a freed slave giving thanks at his feet
 Statue of George Washington (Houdon)

See also
 Presidential memorials in the United States

 Other
American presidents
American presidents
American presidents